Howell Gilliam Trogden (October 24, 1841 – December 2, 1910) was an American soldier who fought in the American Civil War. Trogden received his country's highest award for bravery during combat, the Medal of Honor. Trogden's medal was won for his gallantry at the Battle of Vicksburg in Mississippi on May 22, 1863. He was honored with the award on August 3, 1894.

Trogden was born in Cedar Falls, North Carolina, and entered service in St. Louis, Missouri, and was buried in Los Angeles, California.

Medal of Honor citation

See also
List of American Civil War Medal of Honor recipients: T–Z

References

1841 births
1910 deaths
American Civil War recipients of the Medal of Honor
Burials in California
People of Missouri in the American Civil War
Military personnel from St. Louis
Union Army soldiers
United States Army Medal of Honor recipients